Robert Sierant (born July 8, 1982 in Łódź) is a Polish defender who plays for Chojniczanka Chojnice.

Career

Club
In July 2011, he joined Olimpia Elbląg.

International
In 1999, he played at the FIFA U-17 World Championship tournament. In 2000 Sierant played at the UEFA European Under-16 Football Championship tournament. In 2001, he won UEFA European Under-18 Football Championship with Poland national under-18 football team.

References

External links
 

1982 births
Living people
Polish footballers
ŁKS Łódź players
Kolejarz Stróże players
Olimpia Elbląg players
Footballers from Łódź
Association football midfielders